Marduk is the historic patron deity of the city of Babylon, in the 18th century BC.

Marduk may also refer to:

Music
 Marduk (band), a Swedish black metal band

Fiction
 Marduk, a fictional character in the video game Sacrifice
 Craig Marduk, a fictional character in the Tekken video game series
 Marduk, a fictional planet in the Empire of Man book series